Anania testacealis is a species of moth in the family Crambidae. It is found in Spain, France, Italy, Austria, the Czech Republic, Slovakia, Hungary, Croatia, Bosnia and Herzegovina, Romania, Ukraine, the Republic of Macedonia and Greece.

References

Moths described in 1847
Pyraustinae
Moths of Europe